Akawaio may refer to:
Akawaio people,  an indigenous people of South America
 Akawaio language, the language of the Akawaio people
 Akawaio (fish), a genus of fish

Language and nationality disambiguation pages